José Guadarrama may refer to:

 José Guadarrama Márquez, Mexican politician
 José Alberto Guadarrama, Mexican football (soccer) player